Philip, Phillip, or Phil Cohen may refer to:

 Phil Cohen (cultural theorist) (born 1943), cultural theorist and ethnographer, British writer and activist
Sir Philip Cohen (British biochemist) (born 1945), British researcher and academic
Philip F. Cohen (born 1950), Canadian nuclear medicine physician and biomedical scientist
Philip P. Cohen (1908–1993), American biochemist
Philip N. Cohen (born 1967), American sociologist
Philip M. Cohen, inventor of several chess variants
Philip J. Cohen (born 1953), American former United Nations advisor and writer
Phillip Ean Cohen, Australian investor
Philip "Little Farvel" Cohen (died 1949), Murder, Inc. criminal
The fictional Hardy Boys character Phil Cohen